Wei Meng (Simplified Chinese:; born 14 June 1989) is a Chinese sports shooter from Laizhou. She competed in the women's skeet event at the 2016 summer olympics and the 2020 summer olympics, equalling her own world record in qualifying and getting bronze in the final.

References

External links
 

1989 births
Living people
Asian Games medalists in shooting
Asian Games gold medalists for China
Asian Games silver medalists for China
Chinese female sport shooters
Medalists at the 2010 Asian Games
Medalists at the 2018 Asian Games
Medalists at the 2020 Summer Olympics
Olympic bronze medalists for China
Olympic shooters of China
Shooters at the 2016 Summer Olympics
Sportspeople from Yantai
Sport shooters from Shandong
Shooters at the 2010 Asian Games
Shooters at the 2018 Asian Games
Shooters at the 2020 Summer Olympics
Olympic medalists in shooting